Flax, also known as common flax or linseed, is a flowering plant, Linum usitatissimum, in the family Linaceae. It is cultivated as a food and fiber crop in regions of the world with temperate climates. Textiles made from flax are known in Western countries as linen and are traditionally used for bed sheets, underclothes, and table linen. Its oil is known as linseed oil. In addition to referring to the plant, the word "flax" may refer to the unspun fibers of the flax plant. The plant species is known only as a cultivated plant and appears to have been domesticated just once from the wild species Linum bienne, called pale flax. The plants called "flax" in New Zealand are, by contrast, members of the genus Phormium.

Description

Several other species in the genus Linum are similar in appearance to L. usitatissimum, cultivated flax, including some that have similar blue flowers, and others with white, yellow, or red flowers. Some of these are perennial plants, unlike L. usitatissimum, which is an annual plant.

The leaves are glaucous green, slender lanceolate, 20–40 mm long, and 3 mm broad.

The flowers are 15–25 mm in diameter with five petals, which can be colored white, blue, yellow, and red depending on the species. The fruit is a round, dry capsule 5–9 mm in diameter, containing several glossy brown seeds shaped like an apple pip, 4–7 mm long.

History
The earliest evidence of humans using wild flax as a textile comes from the present-day Republic of Georgia, where spun, dyed, and knotted wild flax fibers found in Dzudzuana Cave date to the Upper Paleolithic, 30,000 years ago. Humans first domesticated flax in the Fertile Crescent region. Evidence exists of a domesticated oilseed flax with increased seed-size from Tell Ramad in Syria and flax fabric fragments from Çatalhöyük in Turkey by  years ago. Use of the crop steadily spread, reaching as far as Switzerland and Germany by 5,000 years ago. In China and India, domesticated flax was cultivated at least 5,000 years ago.

Flax was cultivated extensively in ancient Egypt, where the temple walls had paintings of flowering flax, and mummies were embalmed using linen. Egyptian priests wore only linen, as flax was considered a symbol of purity. Phoenicians traded Egyptian linen throughout the Mediterranean and the Romans used it for their sails. As the Roman Empire declined, so did flax production.  But with laws designed to publicize the hygiene of linen textiles and the health of linseed oil, Charlemagne revived the crop in the eighth century CE. Eventually, Flanders became the major center of the European linen industry in the Middle Ages. In North America, colonists introduced flax, and it flourished there, but by the early 20th century, cheap cotton and rising farm wages had caused production of flax to become concentrated in northern Russia, which came to provide 90% of the world's output. Since then, flax has lost its importance as a commercial crop, due to the easy availability of more durable fibres.

Uses

Flax is grown for its seeds, which can be ground into a meal or turned into linseed oil, a product used as a nutritional supplement and as an ingredient in many wood-finishing products. Flax is also grown as an ornamental plant in gardens. Moreover, flax fibers are used to make linen. The specific epithet in its species name, usitatissimum, means "most useful".

Flax fibers taken from the stem of the plant are two to three times as strong as cotton fibers. Additionally, flax fibers are naturally smooth and straight. Europe and North America both depended on flax for plant-based cloth until the 19th century, when cotton overtook flax as the most common plant for making rag-based paper. Flax is grown on the Canadian prairies for linseed oil, which is used as a drying oil in paints and varnishes and in products such as linoleum and printing inks.

Linseed meal, the by-product of producing linseed oil from flax seeds, is used as livestock fodder.

Flax seeds
Flax seeds occur in two basic varieties/colors: brown or yellow (golden linseeds). Most types of these basic varieties have similar nutritional characteristics and equal numbers of short-chain omega-3 fatty acids. Yellow flax seeds, called solin (trade name "Linola"), have a similar oil profile to brown flax seeds and both are very high in omega-3s (alpha-linolenic acid (ALA), specifically).
Flax seeds produce a vegetable oil known as flax seed oil or linseed oil, which is one of the oldest commercial oils. It is an edible oil obtained by expeller pressing and sometimes followed by solvent extraction. Solvent-processed flax seed oil has been used for many centuries as a drying oil in painting and varnishing.

Although brown flax seed varieties may be consumed as readily as the yellow ones, and have been for thousands of years, these varieties are more commonly used in paints, for fiber, and for cattle feed.

Culinary

Whole flax seeds are chemically stable, but ground flax seed meal, because of oxidation, may go rancid when left exposed to air at room temperature in as little as a week. Refrigeration and storage in sealed containers will keep ground flax seed meal for a longer period before it turns rancid. Under conditions similar to those found in commercial bakeries, trained sensory panelists could not detect differences between bread made with freshly ground flax seed and bread made with flax seed that had been milled four months earlier and stored at room temperature. If packed immediately without exposure to air and light, milled flax seed is stable against excessive oxidation when stored for nine months at room temperature, and under warehouse conditions, for 20 months at ambient temperatures.

Three phenolic glucosides—secoisolariciresinol diglucoside, p-coumaric acid glucoside, and ferulic acid glucoside—are present in commercial breads containing flax seed.

Fodder
After crushing the seeds to extract linseed oil, the resultant linseed meal is a protein-rich feed for ruminants, rabbits, and fish. It is also often used as feed for swine and poultry, and has also been used in horse concentrate and dog food. The high omega-3 fatty acid (ALA) content of linseed meal "softens" milk, eggs or meat, which means it causes a higher unsaturated fat content and thus lowers its storage time. The high omega-3 content also has a further disadvantage, because this fatty acid oxidises and goes rancid quickly, which shortens the storage time. Linola was developed in Australia and introduced in the 1990s with less omega-3, specifically to serve as fodder. Another disadvantage of the meal and seed is that it contains a vitamin B6 (pyridoxine) antagonist, and may require this vitamin be supplemented, especially in chickens, and furthermore linseeds contain 2–7% of mucilage (fibre), which may be beneficial in humans and cattle, but cannot be digested by non-ruminants and can be detrimental to young animals, unless possibly treated with enzymes.

Linseed meal is added to cattle feed as a protein supplement. It can only be added at low percentages due to the high fat content, which is unhealthy for ruminants. Compared to oilseed meal from crucifers it measures as having lower nutrient values, however, good results are obtained in cattle, perhaps due to the mucilage, which may aid in slowing digestion and thus allowing more time to absorb nutrients. One study found that feeding flax seeds may increase omega-3 content in beef, while another found no differences. It might also act as a substitute for tallow in increasing marbling. In the US, flax-based feed for ruminants is often somewhat more expensive than other feeds on a nutrient basis. Sheep feeding on low quality forage are able to eat a large amount of linseed meal, up to 40% in one test, with positive consequences. It has been fed as supplement to water buffaloes in India, and provided a better diet than forage alone, but not as good as when substituted with soy meal. It is considered an inferior protein supplement for swine because of its fibre, the vitamin antagonist, the high omega-3 content and its low lysine content, and can only be used in small amounts in the feed. Although it may increase the omega-3 content in eggs and meat, it is also an inferior and potentially toxic feed for poultry, although it can be used in small amounts. The meal is an adequate and traditional source of protein for rabbits at 8–10%. Its use in fish feeds is limited.

Raw, immature linseeds contain an amount of cyanogenic compounds and can be dangerous for monogastric animals such as horses or rabbits. Boiling removes the danger. This is not an issue in meal cake due to the processing temperature during oil extraction.

Flax straw left over from the harvesting of oilseed is not very nutritious; it is tough and indigestible, and is not recommended to use as ruminant fodder, although it may be used as bedding or baled as windbreaks.

Flax fibers

Flax fiber is extracted from the bast beneath the surface of the stem of the flax plant. Flax fiber is soft, lustrous, and flexible; bundles of fiber have the appearance of blonde hair, hence the description "flaxen" hair. It is stronger than cotton fiber, but less elastic. 

The use of flax fibers dates back tens of millennia; linen, a refined textile made from flax fibers, was worn widely by Sumerian priests more than 4,000 years ago. Industrial-scale flax fiber processing existed in antiquity. A Bronze Age factory dedicated to flax processing was discovered in Euonymeia, Greece.

The best grades are used for fabrics such as damasks, lace, and sheeting. Coarser grades are used for the manufacturing of twine and rope, and historically, for canvas and webbing equipment. Flax fiber is a raw material used in the high-quality paper industry for the use of printed banknotes, laboratory paper (blotting and filter), rolling paper for cigarettes, and tea bags.

Flax mills for spinning flaxen yarn were invented by John Kendrew and Thomas Porthouse of Darlington, England, in 1787. New methods of processing flax  have led to renewed interest in the use of flax as an industrial fiber.

Nutrition

Flax seeds are 7% water, 18% protein, 29% carbohydrates, and 42% fat (table). In  as a reference amount, flax seeds provide 534 kilocalories and contain high levels (20% or more of the Daily Value, DV) of protein, dietary fiber, several B vitamins, and dietary minerals. Flax seeds are especially rich in thiamine, magnesium, and phosphorus (DVs above 90%) (table).

As a percentage of total fat, flax seeds contain 54% omega-3 fatty acids (mostly ALA), 18% omega-9 fatty acids (oleic acid), and 6% omega-6 fatty acids (linoleic acid); the seeds contain 9% saturated fat, including 5% as palmitic acid. Flax seed oil contains 53% 18:3 omega-3 fatty acids (mostly ALA) and 13% 18:2 omega-6 fatty acids.

Health research
A meta-analysis showed that consumption of more than 30 g of flax-seed daily for more than 12 weeks reduced body weight, body mass index (BMI), and waist circumference for persons with a BMI greater than 27. Another meta-analysis showed that consumption of flax seeds for more than 12 weeks produced small reductions in systolic blood pressure and diastolic blood pressure. A third showed that consuming flax seed or its derivatives may reduce total and LDL-cholesterol in the blood, with greater benefits in women and people with high cholesterol. A fourth showed a small reduction in c-reactive protein (a marker of inflammation) only in persons with a body mass index greater than 30.

Linseed oil

Toxicity
Flax seed and its oil are generally recognized as safe for human consumption. Like many common foods, flax contains small amounts of cyanogenic glycoside, which is nontoxic when consumed in typical amounts, but may be toxic when consumed in large quantities as with staple foods such as cassava. Typical concentrations (for example, 0.48% in a sample of defatted dehusked flax seed meal) can be removed by special processing.

When the seeds are chewed, crushed or ground, the cyanogenic glycosides can be converted into the poison hydrogen cyanide.

Cultivation
The soils most suitable for flax, besides the alluvial kind, are deep loams containing a large proportion of organic matter. Flax is often found growing just above the waterline in cranberry bogs. Heavy clays are unsuitable, as are soils of a gravelly or dry sandy nature. Farming flax requires few fertilizers or pesticides. Within eight weeks of sowing, the plant can reach  in height, reaching  within 50 days.

Diseases

Production
In 2020, world production of flax (linseed) was 3.4 million tonnes, led by Kazakhstan with 31% of the total. Other major producers were Russia, Canada, and China (table).

Harvesting

Maturation
Flax is harvested for fiber production after about 100 days, or a month after the plants flower and two weeks after the seed capsules form. The bases of the plants begin to turn yellow. If the plants are still green, the seed will not be useful, and the fiber will be underdeveloped. The fiber degrades once the plants turn brown.

Flax grown for seed is allowed to mature until the seed capsules are yellow and just starting to split; it is then harvested in various ways. A combine harvester may either cut only the heads of the plants, or the whole plant. These are then dried to extract the seed. The amount of weeds in the straw affects its marketability, and this, coupled with market prices, determines whether the farmer chooses to harvest the flax straw. If the flax straw is not harvested, typically, it is burned, since the stalks are quite tough and decompose slowly (i.e., not in a single season). Formed into windrows from the harvesting process, the straw often clogs up tillage and planting equipment. Flax straw that is not of sufficient quality for fiber uses can be baled to build shelters for farm animals, or sold as biofuel, or removed from the field in the spring.

Two ways are used to harvest flax fiber, one involving mechanized equipment (combines), and a second method, more manual and targeting maximum fiber length.

Harvesting for fiber

Mechanical
Flax for fiber production is usually harvested by a specialized flax harvester. Usually built on the same machine base as a combine, but instead of the cutting head it has a flax puller. The flax plant turned over and is gripped by rubber belts roughly 20–25 cm (8–10 inches) above ground, to avoid getting grasses and weeds in the flax. The rubber belts then pull the whole plant out of the ground with the roots so the whole length of the plant fiber can be used. The plants then pass over the machine and is placed on the field crosswise to the harvesters direction of travel. The plants are left in the field for field retting.

The mature plant can also be cut with mowing equipment, similar to hay harvesting, and raked into windrows. When dried sufficiently, a combine then harvests the seeds similar to wheat or oat harvesting.

Manual
The plant is pulled up with the roots (not cut), so as to increase the fiber length. After this, the flax is allowed to dry, the seeds are removed, and it is then retted. Dependent upon climatic conditions, characteristics of the sown flax and fields, the flax remains on the ground between two weeks and two months for retting. As a result of alternating rain and the sun, an enzymatic action degrades the pectins which bind fibers to the straw. The farmers turn over the straw during retting to evenly rett the stalks. When the straw is retted and sufficiently dry, it is rolled up. It is then stored by farmers before extracting the fibers.

Processing

Threshing is the process of removing the seeds from the rest of the plant. Separating the usable flax fibers from other components requires pulling the stems through a hackle and/or beating the plants to break them.

Flax processing is divided into two parts: the first part is generally done by the farmer, to bring the flax fiber into a fit state for general or common purposes. This can be performed by three machines: one for threshing out the seed, one for breaking and separating the straw (stem) from the fiber, and one for further separating the broken straw and matter from the fiber.

The second part of the process brings the flax into a state for the very finest purposes, such as lace, cambric, damask, and very fine linen. This second part is performed by a refining machine.

Preparation for spinning

Before the flax fibers can be spun into linen, they must be separated from the rest of the stalk. The first step in this process is retting, which is the process of rotting away the inner stalk, leaving the outer parts intact. At this point, straw, or coarse outer stem (cortex and epidermis), is still remaining. To remove this, the flax is "broken", the straw is broken up into small, short bits, while the actual fiber is left unharmed. Scutching scrapes the outer straw from the fiber. The stems are then pulled through "hackles", which act like combs to remove the straw and some shorter fibers out of the long fiber.

Retting flax
Several methods are used for retting flax. It can be retted in a pond, stream, field, or tank. When the retting is complete, the bundles of flax feel soft and slimy, and quite a few fibers are standing out from the stalks. When wrapped around a finger, the inner woody part springs away from the fibers. Pond retting is the fastest. It consists of placing the flax in a pool of water which will not evaporate. It generally takes place in a shallow pool which will warm up dramatically in the sun; the process may take from a few days to a few weeks. Pond-retted flax is traditionally considered of lower quality, possibly because the product can become dirty, and is easily over-retted, damaging the fiber. This form of retting also produces quite an odor. Stream retting is similar to pool retting, but the flax is submerged in bundles in a stream or river. This generally takes two or three weeks longer than pond retting, but the end product is less likely to be dirty, does not smell as bad, and because the water is cooler, is less likely to be over-retted. Both pond and stream retting were traditionally used less because they pollute the waters used for the process.

In field retting, the flax is laid out in a large field, and dew is allowed to collect on it. This process normally takes a month or more, but is generally considered to provide the highest quality flax fibers, and it produces the least pollution.

Retting can also be done in a plastic trash can or any type of water-tight container of wood, concrete, earthenware, or plastic. Metal containers will not work, as an acid is produced when retting, and it would corrode the metal. If the water is any colder, it takes longer. Scum collects at the top, and an odor is given off the same as in pond retting. 'Enzymatic' retting of flax has been researched as a technique to engineer fibers with specific properties.

Dressing the flax

Dressing the flax is the process of removing the straw from the fibers. Dressing consists of three steps: breaking, scutching, and heckling. The breaking breaks up the straw. Some of the straw is scraped from the fibers in the scutching process, and finally, the fiber is pulled through heckles to remove the last bits of straw.

Breaking breaks up the straw into short segments. 

Scutching removes some of the straw from the fiber.

Heckling is pulling the fiber through various sizes of heckling combs or heckles. A heckle is a bed of "nails"—sharp, long-tapered, tempered, polished steel pins driven into wooden blocks at regular spacing.

Genetically modified flax contamination

In September 2009, Canadian flax exports reportedly had been contaminated by a deregistered genetically modified cultivar called 'Triffid' that had food and feed safety approval in Canada and the U.S. Canadian growers and the Flax Council of Canada raised concerns about the marketability of this cultivar in Europe where a zero tolerance policy exists regarding unapproved genetically modified organisms. Consequently, Triffid was deregistered in 2010 and never grown commercially in Canada or the U.S. Triffid stores were destroyed, but future exports and further tests at the University of Saskatchewan proved that Triffid persisted in at least two Canadian flax varieties, possibly affecting future crops. Canadian flax seed cultivars were reconstituted with Triffid-free seed used to plant the 2014 crop. Laboratories are certified to test for the presence of Triffid at a level of one seed in 10,000.

Symbolic images

Flax is an emblem of Northern Ireland and displayed by the Northern Ireland Assembly. In a coronet, it appeared on the reverse of the British one-pound coin to represent Northern Ireland on coins minted in 1986, 1991, and 2014. Flax also represents Northern Ireland on the badge of the Supreme Court of the United Kingdom and on various logos associated with it.

Common flax is the national flower of Belarus.

In early versions of the Sleeping Beauty tale, such as "Sun, Moon, and Talia" by Giambattista Basile, the princess pricks her finger, not on a spindle, but on a sliver of flax, which later is sucked out by her children conceived as she sleeps.

See also

References

 
Linum
Fiber plants
Crops originating from Asia
Flora of Western Asia
Crops
Biodegradable materials
Demulcents
Painting materials
Plants described in 1753
Articles containing video clips
Founder crops